Biem, or Bam, is an Oceanic language of northeast New Guinea, spoken on Bam, Blup Blup, Kadovar, and Vial (also known as Wei) islands (eastern four of the Schouten Islands) off the coast of Wewak.

References

Languages of Papua New Guinea
Schouten languages